Harley may refer to:

People
 Harley (given name)
 Harley (surname)

Places
 Harley, Ontario, a township in Canada
 Harley, Brant County, Ontario, Canada
 Harley, Shropshire, England
 Harley, South Yorkshire, England
 Harley Street, in London, England

Other
 Harley-Davidson, an American motorcycle manufacturer
 Harley Owners Group (H.O.G.), a club for Harley-Davidson motorcycle owners
 Harley Benton Guitars, a brand name created by German music instrument retailer Thomann 
 Harley Lyrics, a 14th-century collection of poems
 Harley Street (TV series), a British television medical drama
 Harley Collection, a collection of manuscripts in the British Library
 The Harley School, a school in Rochester, New York
 Harley Psalter, an 11th-century illustrated manuscript

See also
 Harley Quinn (disambiguation)
 
 Harly, a commune in France
 Harly Forest, a hill range in Germany